Mobberley railway station serves the village of Mobberley in Cheshire, England. It is to the north of the village and is managed by Northern Trains. The station is 18½ miles (30 km) south of Manchester Piccadilly on the Mid-Cheshire line towards Chester.

History 

The station was opened on 12 May 1862 by the Cheshire Midland Railway which was absorbed by the Cheshire Lines Committee on 15 August 1867. The station passed on to the London Midland Region of British Railways on nationalisation in 1948. When Sectorisation was introduced in the 1980s, the station was served by Regional Railways until the Privatisation of British Railways.

The station retains many of its original features and buildings, although these have been converted for residential use.

Facilities
The station is (like the majority of those on the line) unstaffed and has no ticket machine, so all tickets must be purchased in advance of travel or on the train.  The main building is in private commercial use, but there are brick shelters on each platform, along with CIS displays, timetable poster boards and a bike rack on platform 2.  A pay phone at the entrance can also be used to request train running information.  Step-free access to both platforms is available via ramps from the level crossing at the Manchester end of the station.  This retains its staffed signal box.

Services 

There is an hourly service westbound to Chester and eastbound to Manchester Piccadilly Monday to Saturday. On Sundays there is now a two-hourly service to Chester and to Southport via Manchester Piccadilly. Mobberley was, until 12 December 2010, a request stop only.

References

Further reading

External links

  Mid-Cheshire Community Rail Partnership

Railway stations in Cheshire
DfT Category F2 stations
Former Cheshire Lines Committee stations
Northern franchise railway stations
1862 establishments in England
Railway stations in Great Britain opened in 1862